The Shri Datta Venkata Sai Temple in Kalloor, India is a replica of the Shirdi Sai Baba temple built by Prabhakar Maharaj.

Gallery 

Hindu temples in Telangana